Herochroma cristata is a species of moth of the family Geometridae first described by William Warren in 1905. It is found in China (Hainan, Guangxi, Sichuan), Taiwan, north-eastern India, Bhutan, Nepal, Thailand, northern Vietnam and Indonesia.

Subspecies
Herochroma cristata cristata (Warren, 1905)
Herochroma cristata rubicunda Inoue 1999

References

Moths described in 1905
Pseudoterpnini
Moths of Asia
Moths of Indonesia
Moths of Taiwan